The Third Legislative Assembly of the Wisconsin Territory convened from , to , and from , to , in regular session.

Major events
 January 26, 1841: The United Kingdom of Great Britain and Ireland took control of Hong Kong.
 February 10, 1841: The Act of Union was proclaimed in Montreal, establishing the Province of Canada.
 March 4, 1841: Inauguration of William Henry Harrison as the 9th President of the United States.
 March 9, 1841: The Supreme Court of the United States ruled in United States v. The Amistad that the Africans who seized control of the ship had been taken into slavery illegally.
 April 4, 1841: President William Henry Harrison died of pneumonia.  
 April 6, 1841: Inauguration of John Tyler as the 10th President of the United States.
 August 16, 1841: President John Tyler vetoed the bill which would have established the Second Bank of the United States.  Enraged Whigs rioted outside the White House.
 December 20, 1841: The Treaty for the Suppression of the African Slave Trade was signed in London by representatives of Austria, Britain, France, Prussia, and Russia.
 February 11, 1842: After a heated argument on the floor of the Council over the appointment of Enos S. Baker as Sheriff of Grant County, Councillor James Russell Vineyard shot and killed Councillor Charles C. P. Arndt. Vineyard subsequently attempted to resign from the Council—his resignation was refused and he was instead expelled.

Major legislation
 February 19, 1841: An Act to provide for the completion of the Capitol at Madison, 1841, Wisc. Terr. Act 37.
 February 18, 1842: Resolutions relative to the removal of Indians.

Sessions
 1st session: December 7, 1840February 19, 1841
 2nd session: December 6, 1841February 19, 1842

Leadership

Council President
 James Maxwell – during the 1st session
 James Collins – during the 2nd session

Speaker of the House of Representatives
 David Newland (D) – during both sessions

Members

Members of the Council

Members of the House of Representatives

Employees

Council employees
 Secretary:
 George Beatty, both sessions
 Sergeant-at-Arms:
 Miles M. Vineyard, 1st session
 Ebenezer Childs, 2nd session

House employees
 Chief Clerk:
 John Catlin, both sessions
 Sergeant-at-Arms:
 Francis M. Rublee, 1st session
 Thomas J. Moorman, 2nd session

Notes

References

External links
 Wisconsin Legislature website

1840 in Wisconsin Territory
1841 in Wisconsin Territory
1842 in Wisconsin Territory
1840 in Wisconsin
1840s in Wisconsin
Wisconsin
Wisconsin
Wisconsin
Wisconsin legislative sessions